George A. Perley (April 11, 1843 – March 6, 1934) was a Canadian politician. He served in the Legislative Assembly of New Brunswick from 1911 to 1917 as an independent member. He died in 1936.

References 

1843 births
1934 deaths